Data sonification is the presentation of data as sound using sonification. It is the auditory equivalent of the more established practice of data visualization.

The usual process for data sonification is directing digital media of a dataset through a software synthesizer and into a digital-to-analog converter to produce sound for humans to experience.

Applications of data sonification include astronomy studies of star creation, interpreting cluster analysis, and geoscience.

Various projects describe the production of sonifications as a collaboration between scientists and musicians.

A target demographic for using data sonification is the blind community because of the inaccessibility of data visualizations.

References

Further media

External links 
Sounds of the Sea at NASA.gov

Data
Data visualization
Augmentative and alternative communication
Assistive technology